The discography of Queensrÿche, an American progressive metal band, consists of sixteen studio albums, five live albums, seven compilation albums, seven video albums, one extended play, thirty-four music videos and thirty-six singles.

Albums

Studio albums

Geoff Tate's Queensrÿche

Live albums

Compilation albums

EP

Singles

Promotional singles

Other appearances

Videos

Video albums

Music videos

Notes

References

External links
 Queensrÿche
 Mindcrime (Geoff Tate)
 Queensrÿche at AllMusic
 
 

Heavy metal group discographies
Discographies of American artists
Discography